Le Messager Ngozi Football Club, commonly referred to as Le Messager FC is a Burundian professional football club based in Ngozi, Ngozi Province of Burundi, that plays in Ligue A, the top division of Burundi football.

Founded in 2005, Le Messager have won three league titles and one Burundian Cup. The club plays its home matches at 5,000 capacity Stade Urukundo.

History 
The club was founded in 2005, when the late president Pierre Nkurunziza decided to set up “Le Messager” football academies. Le Messager Ngozi had won promotion from the second division at the end of the 2011–12 season finished their first season in the top-flight of Burundi football, 2012–13, on the 5th place.

In the 2013–14 season, Le Messager finished 4th in the league and reached the final of the Coupe du Président de la République losing 1–1 (3–4 on penalty shootout) to LLB Académic,  qualifying for CAF Confederation Cup 

The following season saw again a fourth-place finish, as well as reaching the quarter-finals of the Coupe du Président de la République, losing 0–3 in front of Athlético Olympique. Le Messager made their continental debut against Benfica de Luanda in the preliminary round of the 2015 CAF Confederation Cup, losing 0–3 on aggregate.

In 2016, the club won its first trophy, the Coupe du Président de la République, beating Vital'O 1–1 (4–3 on penalty shootout) in the final and, also came out as runners-up in the 2015–16 Ligue A season.

In the following season, Le Messager finished sixth in Ligue A and  returned to the Coupe du Président de la République final were was defeated 1–2 by Olympic Star de Muyinga. In 2017 CAF Confederation Cup preliminary round, beat the Zanzibarian club KVZ 4–2 on aggregate, advancing to the first round where they were eliminated by Zesco United (0–2 away and 2–2 home).

Squad

Honours
Burundi Ligue A
Winners (3): 2017–18, 2019–20, 2020–21
Runners-up (1): 2015–16

Burundi Ligue B
Winners (1): 2011–12

Coupe du Président de la République
Winners (1): 2016.
Runners-up (2): 2014, 2017.

Performance in CAF competitions

League history
Burundi Ligue A: 2012–now
Burundi Ligue B: 2005–2012

References

External links
 Soccerway
 

Football clubs in Burundi